The Wiltshire Women's cricket team is the women's representative cricket team for the English historic county of Wiltshire. They play their home games at various grounds across the county and are captained by Isla Thomson. In 2019, they played in Division Three of the last season of the Women's County Championship, and have since competed in the Women's Twenty20 Cup. They are partnered with the regional side Western Storm.

History
Wiltshire played their first recorded match in 2000, and joined the Women's County Championship a year later. In their first season, they finished 5th in Division 3, losing all four of their matches, and they were relegated a season later in 2002. After this, Wiltshire played in the Emerging Counties and County Challenge competitions, the tier below the County Championship, until 2008 when they joined Division 5. Since then, Wiltshire have played in the lowest division of the Championship, with their best finishes coming in 2010 and 2013 when they finished 2nd in their division. 

Wiltshire have also competed in the Women's Twenty20 Cup since it began in 2009. When the tournament was regionalised, the side was successful in Division 2 South & West, winning the group in 2010 and beating Buckinghamshire in the Division Final in 2011. Since the national structure of the tournament was implemented in 2015, Wiltshire have played in the bottom tier of the competition, achieving their best finish, 2nd in Division 4B, in 2016. In 2021, they competed in the South West Group of the Twenty20 Cup, but finished bottom. They finished third in their group in the 2022 Women's Twenty20 Cup, with two wins.

Players

Current squad
Based on appearances in the 2022 season.

Notable players
Players who have played for Wiltshire and played internationally are listed below, in order of first international appearance (given in brackets):

 Janet Godman (1991)
 Lisa Keightley (1995)

Seasons

Women's County Championship

Women's Twenty20 Cup

See also
 Wiltshire County Cricket Club
 Western Storm

References

Cricket in Wiltshire
Women's cricket teams in England
Wiltshire County Cricket Club